Gilbert of Narbonne was a Goth count of Narbonne who governed until about 750. His successor was Miló.

8th-century Visigothic people
People from Narbonne